Two ships in the United States Navy have been named USS Windsor.

 The first  was an attack transport during World War II.
 The second  was an  during World War II.

United States Navy ship names